The Boston College Eagles women's lacrosse team is an NCAA Division I college lacrosse team representing Boston College as part of the Atlantic Coast Conference. They play their home games at Newton Soccer Complex in Newton, Massachusetts and occasionally, at Alumni Stadium in Chestnut Hill, Massachusetts.

Individual career records

Reference:

Individual single-season records

Seasons

Postseason Results

The Eagles have appeared in 9 NCAA tournaments. Their postseason record is 17–8.

References

External links 

 Official website

 
College women's lacrosse teams in the United States
Atlantic Coast Conference women's lacrosse
Lacrosse clubs established in 1992
1992 establishments in Massachusetts
Women in Boston
Women's sports in Massachusetts